The Senussi Cave Railway was a 400-yard (366 m) long 2 ft (610 mm) narrow gauge railway, which was built in 1941 during the Siege of Tobruk at the Senussi Cave near Tobruk, Libya.

History 

The Senussi Cave Railway lead from a military road that was blasted into the mountains on 28 August 1941 above a wadi east of Tobruk harbour to the Senussi Cave.

The Senussi Cave had been reinforced during World War II by Italian troops with a concrete arch. It was captured by British and Australian troops in the summer of 1941 and prepared to be used as a field hospital named "Senussi Hospital" cave. However, eventually it was used as bomb proof stores. Up to 300 t of ammunition and goods could be securely store there.

Photos

Rolling stock 
 2 diesel locos
 6 wagons

References

External links 

 Australian War Memorial: Siege of Tobruk

Narrow gauge railways in Libya
Conflicts in 1941
1941 in Libya
Tobruk
Sieges involving the United Kingdom
Sieges involving Australia
Western Desert campaign
Libya in World War II
Sieges of World War II